The 1936 Utah Utes football team was an American football team that represented the University of Utah as a member of the Rocky Mountain Conference (RMC) during the 1936 college football season. In their 12thseason under head coach Ike Armstrong, the Utes compiled an overall record of 6–3 with a mark of 5–2 in conference play, placing third in the RMC.

In 1936, the AP Poll began ranking teams on a weekly basis. On November 14, Utah played its first ranked opponent when Texas A&M visited Ute Stadium for homecoming. Utah lost, 20–7.

Schedule

References

Utah
Utah Utes football seasons
Utah Utes football